Tachi Bagarchhap  is a village development committee in Manang District in the Gandaki Zone of northern Nepal. At the time of the 2011 Nepal census it had a population of 544.

References

Populated places in Manang District, Nepal